The Johnson–Jeffries riots refer to the dozens of race riots that occurred throughout the United States after African-American boxer Jack Johnson defeated white boxer James J. Jeffries in a boxing match termed the "Fight of the Century". Johnson became the first black World Heavyweight champion in 1908 which made him unpopular with the predominantly white audience of boxing. Jeffries, a former heavyweight champion came out of retirement to fight Johnson and was nicknamed the "Great White Hope". After Johnson defeated Jeffries on July 4, 1910, many white people felt humiliated and began attacking black people who were celebrating Johnson's victory.

Background
Jack Johnson had attempted to become heavyweight champion in boxing for several years, but had trouble doing so as the sport was heavily segregated at the beginning of the 20th century. He eventually did become world heavyweight champion after defeating Canadian boxer Tommy Burns in Sydney, Australia on December 26, 1908. Johnson being heavyweight champion angered many whites, who felt his victory was undermining the ideology of white supremacy. Johnson's personal life also angered many white people, as he was notoriously flamboyant and married a white woman. Johnson was considered to be the most hated man in America.

Following Johnson's defeat of Burns, American novelist Jack London wrote a column calling upon Jim Jeffries to come out of retirement and face Johnson, so the heavyweight title could be reclaimed by a white man. Jeffries was out of shape at the time and initially refused to fight Johnson but agreed to do so once boxing promoter Tex Rickard offered Jeffries an unprecedented payout of $120,000 if he defeated Johnson. Jeffries accepted and became known as the "Great White Hope".

The fight

The fight occurred on July 4, 1910 in Reno, Nevada. Over 22,000 spectators watched the fight at the arena and tens of thousands packed in congregation halls across the nation to receive live telegraphs reporting on the fight. Johnson quickly began to dominate the fight and eventually defeated Jeffries with a knockout in the 15th round.

The riots

The fight came during a period of heightened racism in the United States. Lynchings of African-Americans were common in 1910, with 67 lynchings of African-Americans occurring that year. Many white people were dismayed by the result of the fight and were angered by African-Americans celebrating Johnson's victory and began attacking them. Within 2 days, 10 people had been killed in six different states.

Riots occurred throughout the country in major cities such as Atlanta, Cincinnati, Houston, New York and St. Louis, as well as small towns such as Keystone, West Virginia and Mounds, Illinois. Baltimore, Chicago, Clarksburg, West Virginia, Columbus, Ohio, Dayton, Ohio, Fort Worth, Johnson County, Missouri, Kansas City, Missouri, Little Rock, Los Angeles, Louisville, New Orleans, Norfolk, Virginia, Omaha, Philadelphia, Roanoke, Virginia, Springfield, Illinois, St. Joseph, Missouri and Wheeling, West Virginia all saw racial disturbances as well.

It is unknown how many people were killed and injured during the riots, but it is estimated that between 11 and 26 people were killed and hundreds more injured.  This article lists 19 people who were killed, including 17 blacks and 2 whites.

Columbus, OH
Around 400 Black Americans held a parade in Columbus, Ohio celebrating Johnson's victory, during which several brawls occurred.

Houston, TX
A report from Houston, Texas read, "Charles Williams, a negro fight enthusiast, had his throat slashed from ear to ear on a streetcar by a white man, having announced too vociferously his appreciation of Jack Johnson's victory in Reno."

Louisiana
At least three black people were killed and several more severely injured after rioting in Shreveport, Louisiana.

Severe unrest occurred in Madison and East Carroll Parishes in Louisiana, where two black men were killed at Lake Providence, Louisiana. Rioting occurred in New Orleans as well.

Little Rock, AR
Two black men were killed by white people in Little Rock, Arkansas.

Mounds, IL
One black person was killed at Mounds, Illinois.

New York City, NY
11 separate riots erupted in New York City, New York within an hour of telegraphs announcing Johnson's victory. Mobs of white people stormed into black neighborhoods throwing stones at and setting fire to buildings and assaulting many black people. White people attempted to lynch two black men, one black man was beaten to death and more than 100 others were injured. Several white people were stabbed or shot by black people in self defense as well.

Norfolk, VA
Over 300 white navy sailors roamed the streets of Norfolk, Virginia looking for black people.

Omaha, NE
Two black men were killed during rioting in Omaha, Nebraska.

Pittsburgh, PA
Three separate riots occurred in Pittsburgh, Pennsylvania. Black people celebrating Johnson's victory were clubbed by police after they blocked streetcars and harassed passengers.

Pueblo, CO
The entire police force of Pueblo, Colorado was needed to quell a riot between black and white people.

Roanoke, VA
A black person was fatally wounded in Roundeye, Virginia.

St. Louis, MO
Black people clashed with police in two separate riots in St. Louis, Missouri after they threatened white people.

Uvalda, GA
During a race riot in Uvalda, Georgia white gunmen opened fire on a construction camp housing black workers. Three black men were killed and five more injured.

Washington D.C.
Mobs numbering as high as 7,000 people engaged in violence on the streets of Washington D.C. Two white men were stabbed to death by black people, hundreds were injured and 236 people were arrested.

Wheeling, WV
In Wheeling, West Virginia, a black man driving an expensive car — just as the playboyish Jack Johnson was famous for — was beset by a mob and hanged.

Wilmington, DE
A large riot occurred in Wilmington, Delaware. A white man was attacked by a mob of black people who were in turn attacked by a large mob of white people who chased them for several blocks.

Aftermath
After the riots, many state and local governments banned the motion picture film depicting the fight out of fear that showing it would spark more race riots. The riots led Congress to ban interstate transportation of boxing films in 1912; the ban was eventually lifted in 1940. The riots are notable for being the first instance of a nationwide race riot.

See also
The Johnson–Jeffries Fight, a motion picture of the fight
Nadir of American race relations
Red Summer, a series of race riots in the United States in 1919
Long, hot summer of 1967, a series of race riots in the United States
King assassination riots, a series of race riots that occurred after the Assassination of Martin Luther King Jr.

References

1910 in the United States
African-American riots in the United States
Boxing in the United States
July 1910 events
White American riots in the United States
History of racism in the United States
Racially motivated violence against African Americans
Mass murder in 1910
Sports riots